The Royal Buckinghamshire Militia (King's Own) was a militia regiment in the United Kingdom from 1758 to 1881, when it was amalgamated into The Oxfordshire Light Infantry.

The regiment was organised in 1759 as the Buckinghamshire Militia. It was embodied in 1778, at which time it was ranked the 10th regiment of militia, and remained active for five years. It was regularly re-ranked through its embodiment, becoming the 40th in 1779, 45th in 1780, 20th in 1781, and 2nd in 1782.

It was embodied again in 1793 for the French Revolutionary Wars, ranked as the 38th, then in 1794 it was retitled as the Royal Buckinghamshire Militia (King's Own). With the resumption of hostilities in 1803, it was embodied as the 49th, and posted to Harwich Barracks. It was disembodied with the peace in 1814.

In 1833, it was ranked as the 35th. It saw service during the Crimean War, being embodied from 1854 to 1856.

In 1881, under the Childers Reforms, the regiment was transferred into The Oxfordshire Light Infantry as the 3rd Battalion. This was embodied during the South African War in 1900.

As part of the Haldane Reforms in 1908, the battalion was disbanded. Its place as the 3rd Battalion was taken by the former Oxfordshire Militia.

Publications

Buckinghamshire Militia, regiments.org

References

Buckinghamshire
Military units and formations disestablished in 1881
Infantry regiments of the British Army
Oxfordshire and Buckinghamshire Light Infantry
Military units and formations in Buckinghamshire